Fritillaria atropurpurea is a species of fritillary known by several common names, including spotted fritillary, purple fritillary, spotted mountainbells, spotted missionbells, and leopard lily.

Distribution 
Fritillaria atropurpurea is native to the Western United States, where it is often found beneath trees in moldy leaf litter at elevations of 1000–3200 m. This species has the widest distribution of fritillaries in North America, growing from California, Arizona and New Mexico north to Oregon and North Dakota.

Description 
The nodding flower has spreading tepals each one or two centimeters long which are yellowish or cream colored with heavy dark purple-brown mottling. The center of the flower has a central style surrounded by stamens with very large yellow anthers.

This species is similar to Fritillaria pinetorum, but it has nodding flowers compared with the latter's erect blooms.

References

External links 
 
 
 Jepson Manual Treatment
 USDA Plants Profile
 Photo gallery

atropurpurea
Flora of California
Flora of the Western United States
Plants described in 1834
Flora without expected TNC conservation status